Sir Frederick Henry Royce, 1st Baronet,  (27 March 1863 – 22 April 1933) was an English engineer famous for his designs of car and aeroplane engines with a reputation for reliability and longevity. With Charles Rolls (1877–1910) and Claude Johnson (1864–1926), he founded Rolls-Royce.

Rolls-Royce initially focused on large 40-50 horsepower motor cars, the Silver Ghost and its successors. Royce produced his first aero engine shortly after the outbreak of the First World War and aircraft engines became Rolls-Royce's principal product.

Royce's health broke down in 1911 and he was persuaded to leave his factory in the Midlands at Derby and, taking a team of designers, move to the south of England spending winters in the south of France. He died at his home in Sussex in the spring of 1933.

Early life
Royce was born in Alwalton, Huntingdonshire, near Peterborough in 1863 to James and Mary Royce (née King). He was the youngest of their five children. His father ran a flour mill which he leased from the Ecclesiastical Commissioners but the business failed and the family moved to London. His father died in 1872 and Royce had to go out to work selling newspapers and delivering telegrams after only one year of formal schooling.

In 1878 he started an apprenticeship with the Great Northern Railway company at its works in Peterborough thanks to the financial help of an aunt. After three years the money ran out. After a short time with a tool-making company in Leeds he returned to London and joined the Electric Light and Power Company. He moved to their Liverpool office in 1882 working on street and theatre lighting.

In 1884, with £20 of savings, he entered a partnership with Ernest Claremont, a friend who contributed £50, and they started a business making domestic electric fittings in a workshop in Cooke Street, Hulme, Manchester, called F. H. Royce and Company. In 1894 they started making dynamos and electric cranes and F. H. Royce & Company was registered as a limited liability company. The company was re-registered in 1899 as Royce Ltd with a public share flotation and a further factory opened in Trafford Park, Manchester.

Partnership with Rolls

Following a decline in trade after the Second Boer War, and the arrival of increasing competition by cranes and dynamos from Germany and the United States, Royce began considering the motor car as a potential new product for the company. With his fascination for all things mechanical he became increasingly focused on motor cars and bought first, in 1901, a small De Dion and in 1902 or 1903 a 1901 model two cylinder Decauville. This did not meet his high standards and so he first improved it and then decided to manufacture a car of his own which he did in a corner of the workshop in 1904.

Two more cars were made. Of the three, which were called Royce and had two cylinder engines, one was given to Ernest Claremont and the other sold to one of the other directors, Henry Edmunds. Edmunds was a friend of Charles Rolls who had a car showroom in London selling imported models and showed him his car and arranged the historic meeting between Rolls and Royce at the Midland Hotel, Manchester, on 4 May 1904. In spite of his preference for three or four cylinder cars, Rolls was impressed with the two-cylinder Royce 10 and in a subsequent agreement of 23 December 1904 agreed to take all the cars Royce could make. These would be of two, three, four and six cylinders and would be badged as Rolls-Royce.

The first Rolls-Royce car, the Rolls-Royce 10 hp, was unveiled at the Paris Salon in December 1904. In 1906 Rolls and Royce formalised their partnership by creating Rolls-Royce Limited, with Royce appointed chief engineer and works director on a salary of £1,250 per annum plus 4% of the profits in excess of £10,000. Royce thus provided the technical expertise to complement Rolls' financial backing and business acumen. By 1907 the company was winning awards for the engineering reliability of its cars.

The Rolls-Royce Eagle was the first aircraft engine to be developed by Rolls-Royce Limited. It was introduced in 1915 to meet British military requirements during the First World War and proved to be one of only two aero engines made by the Allies that was neither a production nor a technical failure.

Royce & Company remained in business as a separate company making cranes until 1932 when it was bought by Herbert Morris of Loughborough. The last Royce-designed crane was built in 1964.

The partnership ended when Rolls died in 1910 in a crash of his Wright Flyer aircraft.

Development of Rolls-Royce
Royce had always worked hard and was renowned for never eating proper meals which resulted in his being taken ill first in 1902 and again in 1911. Ill health had forced his move away from Derby in 1912. In the same year, he had a major operation in London and was given only a few months to live by the doctors. In spite of this he returned to work but was prevented from visiting the factory, which had moved to larger premises, fitted out to detailed plans by Royce, in Derby in 1908. He insisted on checking all new designs and engineers and draughtsmen had to take the drawings to be personally checked by him, a daunting prospect with his well-known perfectionism. He had a villa built at Le Canadel in the south of France and a further home at Crowborough, East Sussex. In 1917, Royce moved to the village of West Wittering, West Sussex.

In October 1928, he began design of the "R" engine while walking with some of his leading engineers on the beach at West Wittering, sketching ideas in the sand. Less than a year later, the "R” engine, designed in his studio in the village, set a new world air speed record of 357.7 miles per hour and won the Schneider Trophy of 1929. When the Ramsay MacDonald government decided not to finance the next attempt in 1931, Lucy, Lady Houston, felt that Britain must not be left out of this contest and sent a telegram to the Prime Minister stating that she would guarantee £100,000, if necessary, towards the cost leading the Government to reverse their previous decision.

Bentley, shock absorber and Merlin 

In 1931, Rolls-Royce Ltd. bought out their rival firm of W. O. Bentley. A "20/25" engine was put into a chassis and a Bentley radiator fitted. An open four-seater body completed the picture. The engine was "hotted-up" and the car was taken down to West Wittering to get Royce's approval. They were somewhat apprehensive of what he would say, but he gave it his blessing. He told them that such a fast car should have a means of varying the stiffness of the springing.

The night before he died he sat up in bed and drew a sketch on the back of an envelope which he gave to Miss Aubin (his nurse and housekeeper) telling her to see that the "boys" in the factory got it safely. He died before it reached Derby. This was the adjustable shock-absorber. Thus, in 1933 the first Bentley made by Rolls-Royce Ltd made its appearance and another famous name carried on.

Following the success of the "R” engine, it was clear that they had an engine that would be of use to the Royal Air Force. As no Government assistance was forthcoming at first, in the national interest they went ahead with development of what was called the "PV-12" engine (standing for Private Venture, 12-cylinder). The idea was to produce an engine of about the same performance as the "R”, albeit with a much longer life.  Rolls-Royce launched the PV-12 in October 1933  and the engine completed its first test in 1934, the year after Royce died. The PV-12 became the Rolls-Royce Merlin engine.

Personal life 

Henry Royce married Minnie Punt in 1893 and they set up home together in Chorlton-cum-Hardy, Manchester, and were joined by his mother, who lived nearby until her death in 1904, and Minnie's niece, Violet. The Royces moved to a newly built house in Knutsford, Cheshire in 1898. The couple separated in 1912.

Royce, who lived by the motto "Whatever is rightly done, however humble, is noble", was appointed OBE in 1918, and was created a baronet, of Seaton in the County of Rutland, in 1930 for his services to British Aviation. He had no children and the baronetcy became extinct on his death.

After he fell ill, Royce was looked after by a nurse, Miss Ethel Aubin for twenty years (after his death she married G.H.R. Tildesley, Royce's solicitor). He died at his house Elmstead in West Wittering on 22 April 1933. His cremated remains were initially buried under his statue at the Rolls-Royce works in Derby, but in 1937 his urn was removed to the parish church of Alwalton, his birthplace.

In 1962, a memorial window dedicated to his memory was unveiled in Westminster Abbey. The window is one of a series designed by Ninian Comper dedicated to the memory of eminent engineers. He is also commemorated in Royce Hall, student accommodation at Loughborough University, and until 2011 at one of Peterborough's Queensgate shopping centre car parks. The Sir Henry Royce Suite, a business suite, is named after him at the Peterborough Marriott Hotel in the Alwalton business park.

Cultural Depictions
Actor Michael Jayston portrayed Royce in the 1972-1973 BBC Television miniseries The Edwardians.

References

Bibliography  
 (1st edition 1964)

External links 

The Sir Henry Royce Foundation, Australia
 (RT 11:16) Part 1 (of 3) of a video containing a visit to Royce's grave
 "Sir Henry Royce, Bart." a 1956 Flight article

British automotive pioneers
British automobile designers
Baronets in the Baronetage of the United Kingdom
Officers of the Order of the British Empire
British automotive engineers
British founders of automobile manufacturers
Rolls-Royce people
1863 births
1933 deaths
Burials in Huntingdonshire
People from Peterborough
People from Knutsford